The 2014 IPC Powerlifting World Championships was a competition for male and female athletes with a disability. With 360 competitors from over 60 countries, the event surpassed the number of entrants of the 2012 Summer Paralympics of London. It was held in Dubai in the United Arab Emirates and ran from 5 to 11 April. The event was held in the Dubai Club for the Disabled.

This proved to be the final event branded as the "IPC Powerlifting World Championships". On 30 November 2016, the International Paralympic Committee, which serves as the international federation for 10 disability sports, including powerlifting, adopted the "World Para" brand for all 10 sports. The world championship events in all of these sports were immediately rebranded as "World Para" championships. Accordingly, future IPC powerlifting championships will be known as "World Para Powerlifting Championships".

Competition
The 2014 IPC Powerlifting World Championships was the sixth championship in its series, and the second hosted by Dubai. Held at the Dubai Club for the Disabled, the competition was attended by more than 330 athletes representing 60 countries, surpassing the number of entrants for the 2012 Summer Paralympics held in London. Twenty lifting events were contested, with ten categories for both female and male competitors. Medals were given for first, second and third place.

Five countries dominated the results: Nigeria, Egypt, China, Iran and Russia. These five countries took home 41 of the total 60 medals, including 14 golds. Although Egypt led the medal table from day three, Nigeria finished atop the table with five golds after Precious Orji won the final women's event, the over 86 kg category. Egypt won the most medals at the competition, with a total of 12, followed by Russia with 9.

Over the 20 events, 15 world records were equaled or surpassed. Some events saw world records broken multiple times, including both heaviest categories. Precious Orji broke her own world record three times to eventually lift 151 kg, while in the men's event Siamand Rahman of Iran broke his own world record three times lifting 285.5 kg. In the lower weights Egypt's Sherif Othman, in the -54 kg category, surpassed the old world record of 181 kg four times, finishing with a lift of 205 kg.

Schedule

Medalists

Men

Women

Medal table

Team Ranking
 Men : 1- IRI 67 2- EGY 65 3- CHN 61
 Women : 1- EGY 68 2- CHN 62 3- RUS 58

References

External links
 Results book
 https://www.paralympic.org/dubai-2014/schedule
 https://www.paralympic.org/static/info/dubai-2014/resIPC/pdf/DU2014/PO/DU2014_PO_C76_POM000000.pdf
 https://www.paralympic.org/static/info/dubai-2014/resIPC/pdf/DU2014/PO/DU2014_PO_C76_POW000000.pdf

World Para Powerlifting Championships
2014 in Emirati sport
International sports competitions hosted by the United Arab Emirates
Sports competitions in Dubai